Thomas William Foster (12 November 1871 – 31 January 1947) was an English first-class cricketer, who played thirteen  matches for Yorkshire County Cricket Club in 1894 and 1895.  He also played a first-class game for XI of Yorkshire against XI of Lancashire in 1894, and for the Yorkshire Second XI in 1893.

Born in Birkdale, Lancashire, England, Foster was a right arm medium pacer, he took 58 wickets at 16.41, including his career best of 9 for 59 against the Marylebone Cricket Club (MCC) at Lord's in 1894.  He took 5 wickets in an innings five times, and 10 wickets in match on three occasions.  Foster also took 7 for 56 against Warwickshire. A right-handed tail ender, he scored 138 runs at 9.20, with a top score of 25.

Foster died in January 1947 in Dewsbury, Yorkshire.

References

External links
Cricinfo Profile
Cricket Archive Statistics

1871 births
1947 deaths
Yorkshire cricketers
Sportspeople from Southport
English cricketers